Richard Kirk Architect is an architectural firm in Australia. Also known as KIRK, it was established in 1995 in Brisbane. The firm has a focus on mass engineered timber projects.

Projects 
Key Projects:

 2022 Bryce Residence, Moffat Beach, Sunshine Coast, Australia
 2021 NIOA Timber Tower, Queensland, Australia

 2019 Mon Repos Turtle Centre,  Queensland, Australia
 2018 Nanyang Technical University, Learning Hub, Singapore
 2016 West End House, Brisbane, Australia
 2016 Creative Industries Precinct 2, Queensland University of Technology, Brisbane, Australia
 2013 Advanced Engineering Building, University of Queensland, Brisbane, Australia
 2012 ABC Brisbane Headquarters, Southbank Brisbane, Australia
 2012 Queensland Symphony Orchestra, Brisbane, Australia
 2012 Fitzgibbon Community Centre, Brisbane, Australia
 2011 Learning Innovation Building, University of Queensland, Brisbane, Australia
 2011 Tinbeerwah Residence, Tinbeerwah, Australia
 2010 AIICS Multi Purpose Hall, Brisbane, Australia
 2010 Rosalie Residence, Brisbane, Australia
 2009 Arbour House, Brisbane, Australia
 2008 Sir Llew Edwards Building, University of Queensland, Brisbane, Australia
 2004 Highgate Hill Residence, Brisbane, Australia
 2004 Cutting Edge, Brisbane, Australia
Proposed

 James Cook University Technology Innovation Complex (JCU TIC), Townsville, Australia
 USC Moreton Bay Campus Expansion - Stage 2, Moreton Bay, Australia
 Peoples Palace Refurbishment, Brisbane CBD, Australia
 Garden International School Performing Arts Centre and Sports Complex, Kuala Lumpur, Malaysia

 UQ Business School, University of Queensland, Brisbane, Australia
 National WWI & WWII Memorials, Canberra, Australia
 Kangaroo Point Bridge, Brisbane, Australia
 Albion Flour Mill Masterplan & Redevelopment, Brisbane, Australia
 Courtyard Residence, Brisbane, Australia
 Macquarie St Apartments, St Lucia, Australia
 Duncan Street Apartments, Brisbane, Australia 
 Binhai Water Palace, Tianjin, China
 Gold Coast Rapid Transit, Gold Coast, Australia

References

External links 
 KIRK studio Architect

Architecture firms of Australia
Companies based in Brisbane
Design companies established in 1995